Amir Mohammad Yazdani Cherati (born 28 September 2000 in Juybar, Iran) is an Iranian wrestler. He competed in the 2021 World Wrestling Championships at Oslo, Norway, where he won the silver medal in the men's 65 kg event.

In 2022, he won the gold medal in his event at the Yasar Dogu Tournament held in Istanbul, Turkey.

References

External links 

2000 births
Living people
Iranian male sport wrestlers
World Wrestling Championships medalists
People from Juybar
Sportspeople from Mazandaran province
21st-century Iranian people